Vernacular music is ordinary, everyday music such as popular and folk music. It is defined partly in terms of its accessibility, standing in contrast to art music. Vernacular music may overlap with non-vernacular, particular in the context of musical commerce, and is often informed by the developments of non-vernacular traditions.

The sales of phonograph records played a dominant role in spreading a cultural taste for popular and vernacular music styles.

See also
Dance music
Low culture
Vernacular Music Center

References

Musicology